The Society for Macedonian Studies was founded on April 29, 1939, in Thessaloniki, Greece. The purpose of the Society is to foster research on the language, archaeology, history and folklore of Macedonia and to promote the cultivation of learning throughout the region. Its headquarters is also home to the Art Gallery of the Society for Macedonian Studies and to the National Theatre of Northern Greece.

References

External links 
  

1939 establishments in Greece
History of Macedonia (Greece)
Organizations based in Thessaloniki
Organizations established in 1939
Macedonian Question